, alternatively titled The Lament of a Lamb or Sheep's Song, is a Japanese horror manga series written and illustrated by Kei Toume. It follows Kazuna, a boy with a mysterious illness which turns out to be vampirism. It was adapted into a live action film in 2002 directed by Junji Hanado, a three-part Drama CD in 2002-03, and an anime OVA series in 2003–04.

The manga was licensed in North America by Tokyopop, and in Russia by Comics Factory.

Story
The story centers on Kazuna, an "average high school student" who starts to lose control at the sight of blood, or even just a blood red colour (as seen in volume one when Yaegashi shows him a bottle of red paint). This problem is traced down to him being a vampire, like his lost sister, Chizuna, who he now turns to for help.

Kazuna lives with his "aunt" and "uncle" (both of whom are actually old friends of his father), after his mother died, and his father took Chizuna and left. Kazuna is friends with an aspiring artist named Yaegashi, who later learns about his condition. They both have feelings for each other at the beginning of the story.

Kazuna and Chizuna's father had committed suicide six months before the start of the (manga) story and trying to understand his suicide is one of the central plot points of the story.

Main characters
 Kazuna Takashiro

Played by: Shun Oguri
 Chizuna's younger brother. Recently afflicted by a "vampiric" condition that is passed down through the Takashiro family. He has his mother's last name. In the first volume of the manga series, he admits to himself he's in love with Yaegashi, but later pushes her away after he has a dream in which he killed her for her blood. As Kazuna slowly cuts ties with Yaegashi, he begins to fall in love with his sister. The two even kiss (once in the anime, twice in the manga). For his disease Chizuna gives him two bottles, one of a serum that gives her some relief, and one for suicide, if it becomes too much. At the end, with Chizuna near death, he declares that he will take the suicide medicine, because he can't think of living on after she dies. Later both are shown unconscious on the floor of Chizuna's bedroom, an empty bottle by his side. The anime ends at this point. The manga continues for one more chapter, showing Yaegashi visiting Kazuna in the hospital - he doesn't remember anything from the past year. According to Chizuna, he looks like their father.

 Chizuna Takashiro

Played by: Natsuki Kato
 Kazuna's elder sister by two years. She has had the blood-craving disease since early childhood. She also has heart problems. She has two moles below her left eye. "A child with a mole in the path of their tears is destined to have a sorrowful life full of them." - Japanese proverb printed in vol 3. The serum she takes to control the Takashiro disease seems to damage her heart and general health.  Chizuna admits to having had a strange relationship with her father after her mother's death. By the way she speaks about their relationship, many have come to believe their relationship went beyond that of merely father/daughter. She seems to be using her brother as a replacement for his father, much like how the father had done to her, as a replacement for his wife. In a dream, Chizuna remembers her mother tried to kill her because she wanted to help Chizuna avoid a life filled with pain and suffering, but was killed by Chizuna. Shizuna constantly told Chizuna lies about her mother's death, to the point that she remembered nothing of it until her dream. Chizuna looks like her mother and dies at the end of both the manga and anime. In both she is upset to hear Kazuna's intention of committing suicide on her death. In the manga she declares on her deathbed that she loved Kazuna as a brother, and says "Ever since I met you I've had you all to myself. But now ... I release you ... and give you back to her. To Yaegashi-san." In the live-action movie, she disappears with doctor Minase to let her brother live a normal life.

 You Yaegashi

Played by: Minami Hinase
 A member of the art club at Kazuna's school and has a crush on Kazuna. She cuts her own hair, and her best friend's name is Emi. She also rarely smiles, making Kazuna happy when she gives him a genuine one during the first volume. She's willing to put herself in danger to be by his side, and even though Kazuna tells her he doesn't like her (in order to protect her) she sees right through his lie. She even offers him her own blood on one occasion, but he turns her away, fearing he'd kill her. On a second occasion, in manga volume 7, she insists on giving her blood to Kazuna, "No! If I let go I'll never see you again!" He takes blood from a wound on her neck. Emi comments afterwards on her "hickey." Parts of this scene were transferred to Chizuna at the end of anime episode 3. She's a very good artist, and in the first manga volume starts a large sketch of Kazuna, who was modeling for her.

 Shin and Natsuko Eda
 Kazuna's foster parents. They care deeply for Kazuna and have offered to adopt him. During the course of the story they try to understand and cope, and to help Kazuna cope, with the events that happen. Aunt Natsuko is featured more prominently in the story than Shin, and makes it very clear she wants Kazuna to think of her as his mother. When Kazuna asks Shin about his father, Shizuna, Shin lies about his death.
Natsuko is voiced by Yoko Sasaki.
Shin is voiced by Jurouta Kosugi.

 Doctor Minase
 Chizuna's doctor. A close friend of the Takashiro family since he was a small child. He has a scar that extends up and down from his left eye, caused by a sharpened stick held by 7-year-old Chizuna. She then lapped his blood. The story says nothing about any injury to his left eye. He has been in love and devoted to her for a long time but his affections have not been reciprocated. He's looking for a cure to the Takashiro "curse". He believes Chizuna was nothing but her mother's replacement in her father's eyes, and seems to be a bit jealous of Kazuna's newfound relationship with the woman he loves, though he states in the second volume he's happy Kazuna is around, for it gives Chizuna a reason to keep living.

 Doctor Shizuna Takashiro
 Chizuna and Kazuna's father. His original family name was "Ishikura", hence he is a Takashiro by marriage rather than blood and did not inherit the disease. He spent years trying to find a way to cure the Takashiro disease (which affected and killed his wife), and committed suicide the year before Chizuna reunited with Kazuna. His relationship with his daughter is questionable. He often cut himself so Chizuna could drink his blood. As a result of this action, his arms quickly became littered in scars. Chizuna believes that her strong resemblance to her mother kept her father from going insane after his wife died.

 Mrs. Ishikura
 Chizuna and Kazuna's paternal grandmother. She appears during a flashback of Chizuna's in the second manga volume. She begs her son Shizuna to take Kazuna somewhere safe because he seems to have not contracted the disease from his mother like Chizuna. The flashback takes place soon after her daughter-in-law's death. The last we see of her is when Shizuna asks his mother not to visit him or his children again. The last she is heard of, in the manga, is that she regularly visits her son's grave.

 Shinobu Kazami
 A manga-only character. The last nurse employed by Dr. Takashiro at his clinic. She was deeply troubled by his suicide and investigates to try and understand why he did it, uncovering two important facts. This leads to a confrontation with Chizuna.

References

External links
Tokyopop's page for the manga
 

1996 manga
2003 anime OVAs
Gentosha manga
Madhouse (company)
Seinen manga
Tokyopop titles
Vampires in animated film
Vampires in anime and manga